Hasan Rud (also Romanized as Ḩasan Rūd; also known as Khasanrud) is a village in Licharegi-ye Hasan Rud Rural District, in the Central District of Bandar-e Anzali County, Gilan Province, Iran. At the 2006 census, its population was 1,266, in 391 families.

References 

Populated places in Bandar-e Anzali County